Parliamentary elections were held in the Grand Duchy of Finland on 1 and 3 July 1916.

Background
The Finnish Parliament had not been in session during the early years of World War I. The Russian army's severe losses to the German army started to awaken among the Finns the hope that they could get regain self-government. The Russian government's plan to totally Russify Finland had been leaked to several Finnish newspapers in 1914, and had been heavily criticized. Its implementation had been suspended for the duration of the war.

Campaign
The workers' and tenant farmers' discontent with their social and economic problems was growing; workers still had to work an average of ten hours per day, and the tenant farmers still rented their lands from the landowning peasants, and they could be expelled from those lands if they did not fulfill their contracts' quite strict conditions. The Social Democrats managed to win their first and so far only parliamentary majority in the Finnish elections by promising more effectively than the bourgeois parties to help the poor and underprivileged people among the Finns.

Results

Aftermath 
The elections would have significant consequences for in Finland's political, administrative and social history. This was the first time the left had held a majority in Finnish parliament, which was only defeated in October 1917 after all the opposition parties, the Finnish Party, Young Finns, Swedish People's Party and Agrarians formed an electoral alliance, the "Bourgeoisie block". The Tokoi Senate was formed under Socialist Oskari Tokoi, one of the first de facto socialist prime ministers in the world (though his title was Chairman of the Senate).

In March 1917 the February Revolution essentially forced Tsar Nicholas II, who had the highest authority in the Grand Duchy of Finland, and who could dissolve the Finnish parliament, to refuse any new laws and appoint a governor-general when he abdicated. This began an administrative crisis, both for the socialists and the bourgeoisie block, on how to proceed. The Provisional Republican Russian government was still in power and administration continued relatively normally, but domestic issues including rising inflation, food shortages and political radicalism was a daily issue in both cities and the countryside.

During the July Days, when then-capital of the Russian provisional Republic, Petrograd, was experiencing anarchic chaos from both military units, anarchists and Bolsheviks, the Finnish parliament came to an agreement to pass and enforce the "Autonomy Law"/"Legality Act" (Valtalaki), which declared that the Finnish Parliament and its Senate was the highest political authority in Finland. The law was passed on 18 July 1917, but was never fully enforced. Just the passage of the Valtalaki act complicated the legal administrative situation, as the (Swedish) Instrument of Government of 1772, which was the ruling law for political administration of the Grand Duchy of Finland, declared the Tsar to be the highest political authority in Finland, but now Nicholas II had abdicated and there was chaos in Petrograd. However, Petrograd's legal government regained control in late July and moderate Alexander Kerensky was appointed Prime Minister, while the Russian government under Kerensky refused to sign the Valtalaki into law as it would have essentially ceded all political and administrative powers of Finland except foreign and military policy to the Finnish parliament. Kerensky and the Petrograd government, still the highest political authority, decided to release a manifesto to break the Finnish Parliament. The manifesto declared, that the Russian provisional government was, legally speaking, the highest authority for the Grand Duchy of Finland, unless the Russian parliament or a Russian-based constitutional convention decided otherwise. This was a win for the "Bourgeoisie block", as in the upcoming elections they united against a common enemy, the Social Democrats, and managed to remove the Social Democrats' parliamentary majority.

References

General elections in Finland
Finland
Parliament
Finland
Election and referendum articles with incomplete results